This is a list of pseudonyms, in various categories.

A pseudonym is a name adopted by a person for a particular purpose, which differs from their true name. A pseudonym may be used by social activists or politicians for political purposes or by others for religious purposes. It may be a soldier's nom de guerre or an author's nom de plume. It may be a performer's stage name or an alias used by visual artists, athletes, fashion designers, or criminals. Pseudonyms are occasionally used in fiction such as by superheroes or other fictional characters.

General list

Other lists

Maternal family names

Pen names

Porn names

Stage names

Fictional pseudonyms

Superhero genre
 Iron Man (Anthony Edward "Tony" Stark) – Marvel Comics
 Captain America (Steven Grant "Steve" Rogers) – Marvel Comics
 The Hulk (Dr. Robert Bruce Banner) – Marvel Comics
 Spider-Man (Peter Benjamin Parker) – Marvel Comics
 Black Cat (Felicia Hardy) – Marvel Comics
 Doctor Octopus (Dr. Otto Gunther Octavius) - Marvel Comics
 Wolverine (Logan, James Howlett) – Marvel Comics
 Amazing-Man (William Blake "Will" Everett) – DC Comics
 Amazing-Man (William Blake "Will" Everett III) – DC Comics
 Amazing-Man (Markus Clay) – DC Comics
 Amethyst, Princess of Gemworld (Amy Winston) – DC Comics
 Animal Man (Bernhard "Buddy" Baker) – DC Comics
 Aquagirl (Lorena Marquez) – DC Comics
 Argus (Nick Kelly) – DC Comics
 Atom (Albert "Al" Pratt) – DC Comics
 Aqualad (Garth) – DC Comics
 Aqualad (Kaldur'ahm / Jackson Hyde) – DC Comics
 Aquaman (Arthur Joseph Curry) – DC Comics
 Superman (Kal-El / Clark Joseph Kent) – DC Comics
 Batgirl (Barbara Gordon) – DC Comics
 Batgirl (Cassandra Cain) – DC Comics
 Batman (Bruce Wayne) – DC Comics
 Catwoman (Selina Kyle) – DC Comics
 Catwoman (Patience Phillips) – 2004 film
 Huntress (Helena Wayne) – DC Comics
Huntress (Helena Bertinelli) – DC Comics
 The Penguin (Oswald Chesterfield Cobblepot) – DC Comics
 The Riddler (Dr. Edward Nigma) – DC Comics
 Rorschach (Walter Joseph Kovacs) – Watchmen (Alan Moore graphic novel)
 The Flash (Jason Peter "Jay" Garrick) – DC Comics
 The Flash (Bartholomew Henry "Barry" Allen) – DC Comics
 The Flash (Wallace Rudolph "Wally" West) – DC Comics
 The Flash (Bartholomew Henry "Bart" Allen II) – DC Comics
 Wonder Woman (Princess Diana of Themyscira / Diana Prince) – DC comics

Other fictional characters
 Lord Voldemort (Thomas Marvolo "Tom" Riddle) – Harry Potter series
 Aramis (Henri d'Aramitz, le Chevalier d'Herblay) – The Three Musketeers
 Scarlet Pimpernel (Sir Percy Blakeney)
 Athos (Armand de Sillègue d'Athos d'Autevielle, Le Comte de La Fère) – The Three Musketeers
 Demosthenes (Valentine Wiggin) – Ender's Game series – OSC
 Chuck Finley (Sam Axe)
 Monika (Monitor Kernel Access / Monika.chr / Monika) – Doki Doki Literature Club!
 d'Artagnan (Charles de Batz-Castelmore) – The Three Musketeers 
 Dylan Sharp (Deryn Sharp – Leviathan by Scott Westerfeld)
 Jeff (Othello Jeffries from the comic strip Mutt and Jeff)
 Locke (Peter Wiggin) – Ender's Game series – OSC
 M (Sir Miles Messervy) – James Bond novels
 Q (Major Boothroyd) – James Bond novels
 Regina Phalange (Phoebe Buffay) – Friends
 Porthos (Isaac de Porthau, Baron du Vallon de Bracieux de Pierrefonds) – The Three Musketeers
 Rusty Shackleford (Dale Gribble)
 Duke Silver (Ron Swanson)
 Speaker for the Dead (Ender Wiggin) – Ender's Game series – OSC
 Ken Adams (Joey Tribbiani) – Friends
 Art Vandelay (George Costanza) – Seinfeld
 La Volpe – Assassin's Creed II and Assassin's Creed: Brotherhood
 Zorro (Don Diego de la Vega)
 Alucard (Adrian Fahrenheit Ţepeş)
 Mr. Underhill (Frodo Baggins) – The Lord of the Rings series
 The Shadow (Lamont Cranston)
 Clint Eastwood (Marty McFly) – Back to the Future Part III
 Heisenberg (Walter White) – Breaking Bad
 Saul Goodman (James "Jimmy" McGill) – Breaking Bad
 L (L Lawliet) – Death Note
 John Smith – Kyon
 The Doctor – Doctor Who

See also
 Literary initials
 List of pen names
 List of people who adopted matrilineal surnames
 List of pseudonyms used in the American Constitutional debates
 List of works published under a pseudonym
 Mononymous persons
 Nicknames of jazz musicians
 Pseudonyms used by U.S. President Donald Trump

References

External links
 FamousFolk – An extensive list of pseudonyms

Lists of names
Lists of people by name
!